Andrew J. Kauffman II (1920–2002) was an American mountaineer who made the first ascent of Gasherbrum I on 5 July 1958 alongside Pete Schoening. He also made the first ascent of Mount Proteus in 1947. Kauffman also served as vice president of the American Alpine Club.

Publications

References

American mountain climbers
1920 births
2002 deaths